Locusts (Slaha/सलह) have been infesting Nepal from time to time. In general, locusts enter Nepal via India. The locust infestations typically have a profound impact on food security in the country.

History of Locust infestation
 1962 Nepal experienced the first recorded locusts attack as per Government of Nepal
 1996 the swarms destroyed 80% of crops in Chitwan and partially damaged crops in the Makwanpur, Mahottari and Bara districts.
 2020 June/July The locusts were spotted in Bara, Sarlahi, Parsa and Rupandehi districts. The swarms came to Nepal via Odisa of India. Some locust were sighted in Kathmandu. Nepal government issued notice to farmer for control of damage. (see also 2019–22 locust infestation).

See also
 List of locust swarms
 Agriculture in Nepal

References

Locust swarms
History of Nepal
1962 in Nepal